Five and Ten Cent Annie is a 1928 American silent comedy film directed by Roy Del Ruth and starring Louise Fazenda, Clyde Cook and William Demarest.

Cast
 Louise Fazenda as Annie  
 Clyde Cook as Elmer Peck  
 William Demarest as Briggs  
 Gertrude Astor as Blonde  
 Tom Ricketts as Adam Peck  
 Douglas Gerrard as Judge  
 George Beranger as Orchestra Leader  
 Eddie Haffner as Midget  
 Flora Finch as Guest  
 Sunshine Hart as Guest  
 Billy Franey as Guest

Preservation status
Only a fragment of the film is known to exist at BFI National Film and Television archive, London.

See also
List of early Warner Bros. sound and talking features
Paradise for Two, a lost 1927 silent about inheritance
The Cruise of the Jasper B (1926), a very similar themed film

References

Bibliography
 Monaco, James. The Encyclopedia of Film. Perigee Books, 1991.

External links

1928 films
1928 comedy films
Silent American comedy films
Films directed by Roy Del Ruth
American silent feature films
1920s English-language films
American black-and-white films
Warner Bros. films
Lost American films
1928 lost films
Lost comedy films
1920s American films